Benelli Super 90 is a series of semi-automatic shotguns introduced by the Italian firearm manufacturer Benelli Armi SpA.  The models include:

Benelli M1
Benelli M2
Benelli M3
Benelli M4